Wetherby railway station can refer to three railway stations in Wetherby, West Yorkshire:

Wetherby (Linton Road) railway station - The last operating railway station in the town
Wetherby (York Road) railway station - The first railway station in the town
Wetherby Racecourse railway station - A former station serving Wetherby Racecourse.